Doris Kristina Hugosson (born 7 May 1963) is a Swedish cross-country skier who competed in the early 1980s. She finished fifth in the 4 × 5 km relay at the 1984 Winter Olympics in Sarajevo.

Cross-country skiing results
All results are sourced from the International Ski Federation (FIS).

Olympic Games

World Cup

Season standings

References

External links
Women's 4 x 5 km cross-country relay Olympic results: 1976-2002 

1963 births
Living people
People from Vilhelmina Municipality
Cross-country skiers at the 1984 Winter Olympics
Swedish female cross-country skiers
20th-century Swedish women